Kudugunchi is a village in the Aland taluk of the Kalaburagi district of the Indian state of Karnataka.

Travel
Autorickshaws and jeeps are used locally as well as to reach-out to neighboring villages.

Education
It has a government primary school and Vidya Vardhaka Sangha High School. The Central University of Karnataka (CUK) is located in this village.

Demographics
As of 2011 India census, Kudugunchi had a population of 8,100 with 4,186 males and 3,914 females.

Geography

Religion
Lingayats are the predominant community. Deepavali and Ugadi are the two major festivals celebrated by the people. "Shri Shantaligeshwara" is the main deity and "Jathra" is celebrated during summer, 7 days after Ugadi. People, irrespective of caste, participate in this 3 day celebration.

Shri Saraswati Gangadhar, the 15th-16th century poet who wrote Shri GuruCharitra श्री गुरूचरित्र is said to have lived in this village.

Economy
Agriculture is the primary occupation in Kadaganchi.

References

Villages in Kalaburagi district